Lenticellaria is a genus of brachiopods belonging to the family Kraussinidae.

The species of this genus are found in Malesia.

Species:

Lenticellaria gregoryi 
Lenticellaria marerubris

References

Terebratulida
Brachiopod genera